Lake Mogan (also called Gölbaşı Gölü) is a small lake in Ankara Province, Turkey.

Geography 

The eastern shore lies along the highway   which traverses Turkey from north to south. It has a circumferential length of 14 kilometers with a length of 11 km. and an average width of 500 meters. The average depth of the lake (in wet season) is about 5 meters.

Geology 
The lake is an alluvial set lake. The tributaries are rivulets with irregular flowrates. According to a report cited by M. Bülent Varlık (ODTÜ’lüler Bülteni N.130 Belleten of Middle East Technical University), during the flood in 1910, Lake Mogan temporarily merged with Lake Eymir.

Recreation area 
Lake Mogan has always been one of the picnic areas of Ankara. Along the shore there are many restaurants as well as camping and fishing points where the main  game fish is carb fish. In 2001 the Metropolitan municipality of Ankara has established a recreation area named Mogan Park at the west shore of the lake. The total area of the park is  where  is reserved for the endangered waterfowl. The total length of the walking track in the area is

References

External links
A report about the Lake Mogan protected area

Mogan
Landforms of Ankara Province
Central Anatolia Region
Tourist attractions in Ankara Province
Important Bird Areas of Turkey